Adlington (Cheshire) railway station serves the village of Adlington in Cheshire, England.

It was staffed for many years but is now unstaffed. The station building is privately owned. There is a ticket machine, which passengers must use to obtain a promise to pay or purchase their ticket before boarding the train.

History
Opened by the London and North Western Railway, it became part of the London, Midland and Scottish Railway during the Grouping of 1923. The line then passed on to the London Midland Region of British Railways on nationalisation in 1948. 
When Sectorisation was introduced, the station was served by Regional Railways until the Privatisation of British Railways.

Service
From 14 December 2008 trains operate on an hourly pattern, terminating at Stoke-on-Trent (southbound) or Manchester Piccadilly (northbound). Some early morning/late night services originate/terminate at Macclesfield.

There are six trains each way on Sundays.

Notes

References
 
 
 
 Station on navigable O.S. map

External links

Railway stations in Cheshire
DfT Category E stations
Former London and North Western Railway stations
Railway stations in Great Britain opened in 1845
Northern franchise railway stations